Thomas Barrett (died ) was a fifteenth-century Bishop of Annaghdown.

Barrett obtained a papal provision to the see of Annaghdown on 17 April 1458 and acted as a suffragan bishop in the English dioceses of Exeter (1458; 1468–75) and Bath and Wells (1482–85).

According to Cotton, Barrett was also a canon of York Minster; holding the Prebendary of Laughton (1466–67).

Barrett died sometime after 1485.

Notes

References

  
 
 
 

15th-century Roman Catholic bishops in Ireland
Year of birth unknown
1485 deaths
Bishops of Annaghdown